The Secret of Bombay is a 1921 German silent adventure film directed by Artur Holz and starring Conrad Veidt, Lil Dagover and Hermann Böttcher. It was shot at the Babelsberg Studios in Berlin. It premiered at the Marmorhaus in Berlin on 6 January 1921.

Cast
 Conrad Veidt as Dichter Tossi
 Lil Dagover as Die Tänzerin Farnese
 Hermann Böttcher as Lord Pombroke
 Bernhard Goetzke as Indischer Abenteurer
 Anton Edthofer as Schiffsarzt Vittorio
 Karl Römer as Teehausbesitzer
 Alfred Abel
 Lewis Brody
 Nien Soen Ling
 Gustav Oberg

References

Bibliography
 Grange, William. Cultural Chronicle of the Weimar Republic. Scarecrow Press, 2008.
 Hardt, Ursula. From Caligari to California: Erich Pommer's life in the International Film Wars. Berghahn Books, 1996.

External links

1921 films
Films of the Weimar Republic
German silent feature films
German adventure films
Films directed by Artur Holz
Films set in India
German black-and-white films
Films produced by Erich Pommer
1921 adventure films
Silent adventure films
1920s German films
Films shot at Babelsberg Studios
1920s German-language films